Sona Mohapatra (born 17 June 1976) is an Indian singer, music composer and lyricist. In addition to her own material, Mohapatra has recorded remixes of songs by David Bowie, with "Let's Dance", and INXS, with "Afterglow", with the latter proving particularly successful.

Background

Sona is a BTech engineering graduate from the College of Engineering and Technology, Bhubaneswar in Mechanical Engineering. She also obtained an MBA degree from Symbiosis Centre for Management & HRD, Pune in marketing & Systems. She later worked as the brand manager in Marico, handling brands like Parachute & Mediker amongst others.

Releases
Her first ventures in music industry started with advertising. One of her most famous jingles was for Tata Salt – "Kal Ka Bharat Hai" & the campaign for Unilever's Close Up has a section of her song "Paas Aao Na," which has been recorded in several languages and aired across 13 countries for four consecutive years. In 2007, she released her debut album, Sona, on Sony Records, which sought to explore the diverse styles of rock, rhythm and blues, Flamenco, Hindustani, Baul and Romani music. In 2009, she released the single Diljale & Paas Aao Na in the same year. She sang the song "Bedardi Raja" in the movie Delhi Belly for Aamir Khan Productions and did a cameo in it. She has also sung the theme songs "Mujhe Kya Bechega Rupaiya" and "Ghar Yaad Aata Hai Mujhe" for the TV show Satyamev Jayate. Her song "Jiya Laage Na" from the soundtrack of Talaash received rave reviews upon its release. Sona has her own band composed of guitar virtuoso Sanjoy Das amongst five more musicians and is an electric live performer who has played at a multitude of live venues including the Lincoln Center in New York & to stadium crowds in India in Chandigarh, Chennai & Siliguri amongst others . She has also headlined the international Jodhpur RIFF festival held at the Mehrangarh Fort. The song "Bolo Na" from Sona was appreciated by the audience.

Career

Sona Mohapatra came to mainstream prominence with the trendbreaking talk show Satyamev Jayate with Aamir Khan, in which she frequently appeared as a lead singer and performer. She was also the executive producer of the musical project on the same show.  Her cameo performances recorded more than 9 million views across sites as per the latest digital count. She confessed in a recent interview that the project was all consuming in terms of the emotional and physical energies invested. It involved multiple lyricists, unconventional subjects, and lots of brainstorming on the songs, lyrics, shoots and recordings. To top it all, all songs were translated and recorded in multiple languages. According to Sona "Oriya influences in Bollywood are rare as yet – unlike an overdose of Punjabi, Rajasthani, Bengali and even Southern music. The song "Mujhe Kya Bechega Rupaiya," sung by Mohapatra, was composed by Ram Sampath and was aired on the third episode of Satyamev Jayate based on celebrating women's freedom. The song has received over 26 million hits on t-series' YouTube channel.

Personal life

Mohapatra is married to Ram Sampath, a song composer and music director in Bollywood. She first met him in 2002, while she was still working as a brand manager with Marico. They were introduced by director Ram Madhvani, with whom Sampath was working for Let's Talk (2002); they married in 2005. Ram later became a household name for his innovative score of the film Delhi Belly (2011), followed by Satyamev Jayate (2012) and Talaash (2012). She is partners with Sampath in their music production house OmGrown Music and reside in Mumbai, where they also have their own studios.

Controversies
In October 2018, she accused Kailash Kher and Anu Malik of sexual misconduct.
Recently, Mohapatra received a death threat after she lashed out at Salman Khan for constantly taking digs at Priyanka Chopra for leaving Bharat.

Documentary
Mohapatra released a documentary film based on her life called Shut Up Sona which won multiple awards at different film festivals

Discography

Bollywood

TV
 Satyamev Jayate – Mujhe Kya Bechega Rupaiya, Ghar Yaad Aata Hai Mujhe and Chanda Pe Dance, Bekhauff

Studio album
 SONA (Song – Bolo Na, Aja Ve, Tere Ishq Nachaya, Abhi Nahin Ana)
 Piya Se Naina on Coke Studio Season 3
 Rangabati on Coke Studio (India), 2015

Compilation
 Love is (2007) – Afterglow
 Teri Deewani – Ishq Nachaya
 Aao Ji – Aja Ve
 Soulful Sufi (2009) – Abhi Nahin Anaa

Video
Dekh Le (2013)

Covers 

 "Zalima" (from Raees)

Non-film Songs 

 "Mon Ke Bojhai" with Sahil Solanki
 "Ghane Badra"
 "Aigiri Nandini"
 "Piya Se Naina"
 "Anhad Naad"

Awards and nominations

References

External links

 
 Sona Mohapatra Biography

Living people
Indian women playback singers
Indian women singer-songwriters
Indian singer-songwriters
Bollywood playback singers
Odia playback singers
College of Engineering and Technology, Bhubaneswar alumni
1976 births
20th-century Indian singers
Singers from Odisha
20th-century Indian women singers
21st-century Indian women singers
21st-century Indian singers
Women musicians from Odisha